Bashmaki is a rural locality (a settlement) in Alexandrovskoye Urban Settlement, Alexandrovsky District, Perm Krai, Russia. The population was 34 as of 2010. There are 6 streets.

Geography 
Bashmaki is located 22 km southwest of Alexandrovsk (the district's administrative centre) by road. Rasik is the nearest rural locality.

References 

Rural localities in Alexandrovsky District